Nomad Rural LLG is a local-level government (LLG) of Western Province, Papua New Guinea.

Wards
01. Igimi
02. Mougulu
03. Kofabi
04. Adumari
05. Ugubi
06. Sefalobi
07. Igibia
08. Sedado
09. Ugulubabi
10. Sadubi
11. Fuma
12. Hafemi
13. Yulabi
14. Suabi
16. Beredina
17. Pipila
18. Wakela
19. Egebila
20. Honabi
21. Udugombi
22. Kukudobi
23. Sirigubi
24. Mabomanibi
25. Wasubi
26. Bubusmabi
27. Aeyedubi
28. Tinahai
29. Sinabi
30. Wanbi
31. Kwobi
32. Testabi
33. Kuda
34. Debepari
35. Sokabi
36. Honinabi
37. Nomad Station
38. Dodomona
39. Filisato/Banisato

References

Local-level governments of Western Province (Papua New Guinea)